The Reginald F. Lewis Museum of Maryland African American History & Culture is a resource for information about the lives and history of African American Marylanders. The Lewis Museum's mission is to collect, preserve, interpret, document, and exhibit the contributions of African American Marylanders using its collection of over 11,000 documents and objects and resources drawn from across the country.

The 82,000 square foot museum is located two blocks from Baltimore's Inner Harbor at 830 E. Pratt Street in Baltimore, Maryland. Opened in 2005, the museum is an affiliate of the Smithsonian Institution, and was named after Reginald F. Lewis, the first African American to build a billion-dollar company, TLC Beatrice International Holdings. Starting from humble beginnings in Baltimore, in 1993 Forbes listed Lewis among the 400 richest Americans with a net worth estimated at $400 million.

Permanent exhibits include "The Strength of the Mind," "Things Hold, Lines Connect," and "Building Maryland, Building America".  Recent major exhibitions include the work of artists Jacob Lawrence and Romare Bearden. Other facilities include an oral history recording and listening studio, a special exhibition gallery, a 200-seat theater auditorium, a classroom, and resource center.

See also
History of the African Americans in Baltimore
List of museums focused on African Americans

References

Further reading 

Mary K. Feeney, "Black History, Powerfully Displayed", Washington Post, September 2, 2005.
 Chris Kaltenbach, Lewis museum to open with 'Slave Ship', The Baltimore Sun, June 2, 2005.

External links
 Official Site
 Reginald F. Lewis Museum of Maryland African American History and Culture; A Slave Ship Speaks: The Wreck of the Henrietta Marie (JSTOR registration required)

Museums in Baltimore
African-American museums in Maryland
African-American history in Baltimore
History museums in Maryland
Little Italy, Baltimore
Smithsonian Institution affiliates
2005 establishments in Maryland
RTKL Associates buildings
Museums established in 2005